The Corabia Solar Park, a large thin-film photovoltaic (PV) power system, is built on a  plot of land near the Corabia commune in Olt County, Romania. It is located in the southern part of the country, 5.5 km from the Danube. 

The Corabia Photovoltaic Park is the fifth MW solar park constructed by Renovatio. The solar park is a 7-megawatt solar power system using 28,602 solar panels of 245 Wp each of state-of-the-art thin film technology, and was completed in December 2012. The solar park is expected to supply 8,500 MWh of electricity per year. Construction began in March 2012 and was completed in December 2012.

The investment cost for the Corabia solar park was €21 million.

See also

Energy policy of the European Union
Photovoltaics
Renewable energy commercialization
Renewable energy in the European Union
Solar power in Romania

References

Photovoltaic power stations in Romania
Corabia
2012 establishments in Romania